Sir Roger Tustin Jackling  (born 23 November 1943) is a British retired Civil Servant who served as the first Director General of the Defence Academy of the United Kingdom.

Career
Educated at Wellington College, New York University and Jesus College, Oxford, Jackling joined the Ministry of Defence in 1969. He was appointed a Fellow of the Centre for International Affairs at Harvard University in 1985 and Principal of the Civil Service College in 1986. He went on to be Deputy Under-Secretary (Resources, Programmes & Finance) and then Second Permanent Under-Secretary of State at the Ministry of Defence from 1997. He was appointed Director General of the Defence Academy of the United Kingdom on its formation in 2002.

References

1943 births
Living people
People educated at Wellington College, Berkshire
New York University alumni
Alumni of Jesus College, Oxford
Harvard University people
Civil servants in the Ministry of Defence (United Kingdom)
Knights Commander of the Order of the Bath
Commanders of the Order of the British Empire